Briege Corkery (born 16 December 1986) in Cork is a camogie player, ladies' Gaelic footballer, and winner of seven All Ireland Senior Camogie medals in 2005, 2006, 2008, 2009, 2014, 2015 and
2018 as well as the winner of eleven All Ireland Senior Ladies' Football medals in 2005, 2006, 2007, 2008, 2009, 2011, 2012, 2013, 2014, 2015 and 2016. 

She has won six Camogie All Stars Awards in 2006, 2008, 2009, 2012, 2014 and 2015. She has also won ten Ladies' Football All Stars Awards in 2005, 2007, 2008, 2009, 2011, 2012, 2013, 2014, 2015 and 2016. In 2008, she became the sixth camogie player in history to be awarded the Texaco Player of the Year award. Corkery is one of the most successful GAA players in history, winning 18 All-Ireland Medals. Team mate Rena Buckley, winner of a record-breaking 18 All-Irelands, had been joint all time medal winner with Corkery up until 2016.

Career
Corkery is the holder of three county Senior championship medals as well as Minor, Intermediate and Senior All-Ireland and Munster honours. She is also a Gaelic footballer and scored a goal in Cork's 2009 All-Ireland semi-final win over Mayo. She was named as national female sports person of the year in 2005 following her performances both in camogie and football. Corkery is also a dual All Star, and won a monthly award from 96/103fm and the Rochestown Park Hotel following the 2008 season. Her brother, Donal Corkery, won a Cork County Junior A League with Cloughduv in 2012.

Honours

Ladies' Gaelic football
Cork
All-Ireland Senior Ladies' Football Championship
Winners: 2005, 2006, 2007, 2008, 2009, 2011, 2012, 2013, 2014, 2015, 2016: 11
Ladies' National Football League 
 2005, 2006, 2008, 2009, 2010, 2011, 2013, 2014, 2015, 2016, 2017: 11
RTÉ Sports Team of the Year Award

Camogie
Cork
All-Ireland Senior Camogie Championship
Winners: 2005, 2006, 2008, 2009, 2014, 2015, 2018: 7
Runners-up: 2004, 2007, 2012, 2016: 4
National Camogie League
Winners: 2006, 2007, 2012: 3

Individual
The Irish Times/ Sport Ireland Sportswoman of the Year
 
Ladies' Gaelic Football All Stars Awards
Winner: 2005, 2007, 2008, 2009, 2011, 2012, 2013, 2014, 2015, 2016: 10
Camogie All Stars
Winner: 2006, 2008, 2009, 2012, 2014, 2015: 6

References

External links 
Official Camogie Website
Denise Cronin’s championship diary in On The Ball Official Camogie Magazine
Fixtures and results for the 2009 O'Duffy Cup
All-Ireland Senior Camogie Championship: Roll of Honour
Video highlights of 2009 championship Part One and part two
Video Highlights of 2009 All Ireland Senior Final
Report of All Ireland final in Irish Times Independent and Examiner

1986 births
Living people
Cork camogie players
Cork inter-county ladies' footballers
Dual camogie–football players
Winners of four All-Ireland medals (ladies' football)